Nicolae Marcoci (born 1923) was a Romanian equestrian. He competed in two events at the 1956 Summer Olympics.

References

External links
 

1923 births
Possibly living people
Romanian male equestrians
Romanian dressage riders
Olympic equestrians of Romania
Equestrians at the 1956 Summer Olympics
Sportspeople from Iași